William Morris (30 July 1918 – 31 December 2002) was a Welsh international footballer who played as an inside forward. He was part of the Burnley side which lost 0–1 to Charlton Athletic in the 1947 FA Cup Final. Between 1947 and 1952, Morris won a total of five caps for the Wales national football team.

After he retired from playing, Morris had two spells as manager of Wrexham and a stint as coach with Colwyn Bay. He and his wife had one son, Gareth Morris, and also spent some years running a guest house in Llandudno and local shop in Llysfaen. His nephew is former Wrexham and Chester City forward Elfed Morris

International caps
Wales score first

References

 
 Billy Morris international caps
 Billy Morris managerial stats at Soccerbase

1918 births
2002 deaths
People from Colwyn Bay
Sportspeople from Conwy County Borough
Welsh footballers
Welsh football managers
Wales international footballers
Association football forwards
Burnley F.C. players
Wrexham A.F.C. managers
English Football League players
English Football League managers
Llandudno F.C. players
FA Cup Final players